A.S. San Giovanni is a Sanmarinese football club, based in San Giovanni sotto le Penne, a civil parish of Borgo Maggiore. The club was founded in 1948. San Giovanni currently plays in Girone B of Campionato Sammarinese di Calcio. The team's colors are white, red and black.
It is the only Sammarinese side not to win any top tier silverware, as they were Serie A2 champions in the 1994-95 season, when there was a promotion/relegation pyramid of two tiers.

History
In the early years of the Second World War, the parish priest of St. John Sotto Le Pen, a hamlet of Borgo Maggiore, collects the children of the country, regarded as the 10th Castello della Repubblica.

Behind the church there is a bumpy pitch, the parish priest puts it at the disposal of the boys provided that they commit themselves to make it fit for use. In the evening, instead of being at the bar all to the field to work in the light of a bulb improvised. Meanwhile, Don Fedele is at pains to find T-shirts, the first will be red and black, and have since remained the same, the colors.
In 1948 was founded the St. John that with the early 1950s, such as Libertas, boasts its own pitch built by the founders behind the church.
A special feature is the management of self-sufficient players, the San Giovanni is born with all the original players of the homonymous village of Borgo Maggiore. The player who most remember is John the Baptist War, who later became President of the SAA.
The coat of arms combines social tradition to the imagination like few others. Divided into 2 distinct parts, the top are well in sight of the "Three Feathers" calling the St. John under the pen (the three peaks of Monte Titano), in fact, appears on the underside of a mountain lion standing guard at a ball .
Coat of arms, too, the result of the work and imagination of its founders.
In the second half of the 1950s there is a disruption that will only last a couple of seasons, in fact in 1957 the St. John makes his return to the field for him no matter what.

Current squad
As of 9 October 2019.

External links
FSGC page
eufo.de – Team Squad

Association football clubs established in 1948
Football clubs in San Marino
Former Italian football clubs
Borgo Maggiore
1948 establishments in San Marino